Simon Dallow (born 18 June 1964) is a New Zealand journalist, former barrister and television personality.

Early years
Dallow, who is the son of Ross Dallow, was educated at Liston College and St Peter's College. He completed his tertiary education at Auckland University, where he studied law. After completing his legal studies, Dallow practised as a litigation and insurance lawyer in Auckland, New Zealand.

Whilst on his overseas experience, the 1987 stock market crash occurred, causing him to change careers, as a future in bankruptcy law was unappealing. Dallow then spent the next six years as a Contiki Tours tour director in Europe, where he met future wife Alison Mau. Both returned to New Zealand in 1993, and began working for TVNZ.

Dallow married Mau in 1996, the couple had two children. They separated in 2009.

Career
Dallow has been employed by TVNZ since 1993, initially as a presenter for TV2's Newsnight, alongside then-partner Alison Mau and Marcus Lush. From 1995, he and Mau presented the mid-evening edition of One Network News; the couple moved to the weekend bulletins in 1998. Since 2006, he has presented 1 News at Six, until 2020 alongside Wendy Petrie. The programme is normally broadcast live from an Auckland city studio; however, Dallow often broadcasts live on location for breaking news stories. From 2005 to 2007, Dallow also presented the mid-morning slot on Mix, then known as Viva FM.

See also
 List of New Zealand television personalities

References

External links
ONE News
Simon Dallow | TVNZ

1964 births
Living people
People educated at Liston College
People educated at St Peter's College, Auckland
New Zealand television newsreaders and news presenters
20th-century New Zealand lawyers
University of Auckland alumni
Te Arawa people
Ngāti Pikiao people
Ngāti Pūkenga people